Friar Luis Zapata de Cárdenas, O.F.M. Rec. (1510 – 24 February 1590) was a Roman Catholic prelate who served as Archbishop of Santafé de Bogotá, capital of the New Kingdom of Granada (1570–1590).

Biography
Luis Zapata de Cárdenas was born in Llerena, Spain, in 1510 and ordained a priest in the Order of Friars Minor Recollects. 
On 8 November 1570 he was appointed during the papacy of Pope Pius V as Archbishop of Santafé en Nueva Granada. 
In May 1571, he was consecrated bishop by Giovanni Battista Castagna, Archbishop of Rossano. 
He served as Archbishop of Santafé en Nueva Granada until his death on 24 Feb 1590.

While bishop, he was the principal consecrator of Dionisio de Santos, Bishop of Cartagena (1575).

References

Literature

External links and additional sources
 (for Chronology of Bishops) 
 (for Chronology of Bishops) 

16th-century Roman Catholic bishops in New Granada
Bishops appointed by Pope Pius V
1510 births
1590 deaths
Franciscan bishops
Roman Catholic archbishops of Bogotá